Netechma obunca is a species of moth of the family Tortricidae. It is found in Pichincha Province, Ecuador.

The wingspan is 14–17 mm. The ground colour of the forewings is cream with slight yellowish brown admixture and brownish dots. The hindwings are whitish, but cream posteriorly and with greyish strigulation (fine streaks).

Etymology
The species name refers to the curved processes of the dorsal part of the transtilla and is derived from Latin obunca (meaning curved at the end).

References

Moths described in 2008
Netechma